Houghton is a hamlet in the East Riding of Yorkshire, England.

It forms part of the civil parish of Sancton.

Houghton Hall was designated a Grade I listed building in 1952 and is now recorded in the National Heritage List for England, maintained by Historic England.

References

External links

Villages in the East Riding of Yorkshire